Sladevale is a rural locality in the Southern Downs Region, Queensland, Australia. In the  Sladevale had a population of 381 people.

History 
Campbell's Plains State School opened on 13 November 1899. In 1903 it was renamed Sladevale State School. It closed on 28 April 1967.

In the  Sladevale had a population of 381 people.

References 

Southern Downs Region
Localities in Queensland